The Morane-Saulnier MS.230 aircraft was the main elementary trainer for the French Armée de l'Air throughout the 1930s. Almost all French pilots flying for the Armée de l'Air at the outbreak of World War II had had their earliest flight training in this machine. It was the equivalent of the Stearman trainer in the United States air services and the de Havilland Tiger Moth in the British Royal Air Force.

Development and design
The MS.230 was designed to meet French Air Ministry requirements.  The MS.230 was a parasol wing monoplane of metal tubular framing with fabric covering throughout, except the forward area of the fuselage, which was metal covered. The instructor and pupil occupied two tandem cockpits. It had a wide fixed landing gear that made it very stable in takeoff and landing. As a monoplane the MS.230 was unlike other trainers of the time, which were mostly biplanes.

It first flew in February 1929 and proved to be an excellent and stable machine which was very easy to fly.
It saw service with military flight schools throughout France and was exported to the air forces of numerous other countries. It also became a popular aircraft for sporting aviation.  An example won the Michelin Cup in 1929.

Numbers of MS.230s survived for many years after the war and became civilian trainers and civilian flying club aircraft. One was used in 1967 to act as camera-ship for air-to-air filming of Darling Lili at Baldonnel Aerodrome, Ireland. Examples are preserved on display in museums in Belgium, Czech Republic, France, Spain and the United States of America.

Popular culture
A MS.230 was used at the end of the movie The Blue Max as the "new monoplane" in which Lt. Stachel is killed during a test flight.

Variants

Source:
MS.229  Hispano-Suiza 8a V8, for the  Schweizer Flieger- und Fliegerabwehrtruppen (Swiss Army Air Service); two built, one converted to Hispano-Suiza 9Qa radial in 1932.

MS.230  over 1,100 built; 20 bought by Romania and 25 by Greece in 1931, 9 each bought by Belgium and Brazil; main Armee de l'Air trainer for years; operated by several well-known private owners including Lynn Garrison and Louis Dolfus; some used for trials with Handley Page slats, or skis; one fitted with Lorraine 9Nb Algol Junior.

MS.231  six built, with 179 kW (240 hp) Lorraine 7Mb, 1930.

MS.232  experimental version with 149 kW (200 hp) Clerget 9Ca diesel, 1930.

MS.233  powered by 172 kW (230 hp) Gnome-Rhône 5Ba or Gnome-Rhône 5Bc, six built in France and 16 in Portugal under licence for the Portuguese military.

MS.234  186 kW (250 hp)  Hispano-Suiza 9Qa engine, two built, one for U.S. Ambassador in Paris.

MS.234/2  converted from MS.130 Coupe Michelin racer with 172 kW) (230 hp) Hispano 9Qb and NACA cowling, entered in 1931 Coupe Michelin air race, 86 kW (250 hp) Hispano-Suiza 9Qa engine. Fitted with a Hispano-Suiza 9Qa engine as MS.234 #2, flown in aerobatic competition by Michael Detroyat until 1938.

MS.235  224 kW (300 hp) Gnome-Rhône 7Kb engine, one built 1930.

MS.235H  twin-float version, first flown 1931.

MS.236  fitted with 160 kW (215 hp) Armstrong Siddeley Lynx IVC, 19 built under licence for Belgian Air Force by SABCA, first flown July 1932.

MS.237  209 kW (280 hp) Salmson 9Aba engine, five built for private users, introduced 1934.

.

Operators

Belgian Air Force

Brazilian Air Force
 
Czechoslovakian Air Force (as C23)

French Air Force
French Navy

Luftwaffe (small numbers)

Hellenic Air Force

Portuguese Air Force

Royal Romanian Air Force

Spanish Republican Air Force

Swiss Air Force

United States Army Air Corps

Venezuelan Air Force

Specifications

See also

References

Bibliography

Further reading

External links

 A History of Greek Military Equipment (1821-today): Greek MS.230 ET2

1920s French military trainer aircraft
Morane-Saulnier aircraft
Aerobatic aircraft
Parasol-wing aircraft
Single-engined tractor aircraft
Aircraft first flown in 1929
World War II aircraft of Switzerland